The Colorado Lightning was an American professional indoor soccer team, founded in 2008.

The team was a charter member of the Professional Arena Soccer League (PASL-Pro), the  Second  division (at the time of play) of arena (indoor) soccer in North America.

They played their home matches at the Budweiser Events Center in Loveland, Colorado. After a single season, during which the team amassed a 4–12 record,  they disbanded.

Roster

Year-by-year

External links
 Professional Arena Soccer League official website

Lightning
Defunct Professional Arena Soccer League teams
Defunct indoor soccer clubs in the United States
Indoor soccer clubs in the United States
2008 establishments in Colorado
2009 disestablishments in Colorado
Association football clubs established in 2008
Association football clubs disestablished in 2009
Loveland, Colorado